Death in the Hand  is a 1948 British short mystery film directed by  A. Barr-Smith, starring Esme Percy, Ernest Jay and Cecile Chevreau. The film marked the debut of John Le Mesurier. It was made by the small independent company Vandyke Productions.

Plot
In a seaside guest house, a nervous piano player, Cosmo Vaughan (Esme Percy), tells a tale of how he read the palms of passengers on board a train and forecast their deaths. But is Mr Vaughan quite what he appears?

Cast
Esme Percy as Cosmo Vaughan
Ernest Jay as MacRae
Cecile Chevreau as Sylvia Mottram
Carleton Hobbs as Chairman
John Le Mesurier as Jack Mottram
Shelagh Fraser as Penelope MacRae
J. Hubert Leslie as Waiter
Nuna Davey as Countrywoman
Norman Shelley as Businessman
Wilfrid Caithness as Rowlandson
Thea Wells as Mrs Rowlandson

References

External links
 

British mystery films
1948 films
1948 mystery films
British short films
American television films
British black-and-white films
1940s English-language films
1940s British films